Nick Carrafa is an Australian actor best known for his television roles as Tony Romeo on the Australian soap opera Neighbours and Alfredo on the comedy series Acropolis Now.

Career
Carrafa began his career with a guest role in the series Special Squad, before guest starring on Prisoner.  He then joined the cast of Neighbours, playing Tony Romeo from episode 628.

Carrafa has appeared in many television series and theatre productions.

Personal life
Carrafa met his wife Fiona Corke before appearing on Neighbours in 1987.

.

Roles
Special Squad (Camilleri 1984)
Prisoner (TV series) (Mick Warner 1986)
The Power, The Passion (Mick Casalla 1989)
Neighbours (Tim Duncan 1985; Tony Romeo 1987–1988; Peter Hannay 1999, 2016)
Blue Heelers (Anthony Kelvin 1996, Phil Grant 2001, Blaine O'Connor 2005)
Acropolis Now (Alfredo 1989)
Phoenix (Sergio Diego 1987)
State Coroner (George Cardillo 1997–1998)
Law of the Land (Neil 1999)
The Secret Life of Us (Bob 2002)
Stingers (Dave Delamonte 2002)
Scooter: Secret Agent (Garner/Agent X-81 2005)

External links
 Nick Carrafa on IMDb

Australian male television actors
Living people
Year of birth missing (living people)